Robin Reda (born 10 May 1991) is a French politician who has represented the 7th constituency of Essonne in the National Assembly since 2017. A member of The Republicans (LR), he previously served as Mayor of Juvisy-sur-Orge from 2014 to 2017.

Political career 
In parliament, Reda has been serving on the Finance Committee (since 2019) and the Committee on Legal Affairs (2017–2021). In addition to his committee assignments, he is part of the French-Egyptian Parliamentary Friendship Group.

Reda was a member of The Republicans until 2017, when he joined the new Soyons Libres party.

He was re-elected in the 2022 French legislative election as a LREM (Ensemble) candidate.

Political positions 
In the Republicans' 2017 leadership election, Reda supported Florence Portelli. Ahead of the Republicans’ 2021 primaries, he endorsed Valérie Pécresse as the party’s candidate for 2022 presidential elections.

References 

1991 births
Living people
Sciences Po alumni
People from Savigny-sur-Orge
Mayors of places in Île-de-France
21st-century French politicians
The Republicans (France) politicians
Regional councillors of France
Deputies of the 15th National Assembly of the French Fifth Republic
French people of Egyptian descent

La République En Marche! politicians
Deputies of the 16th National Assembly of the French Fifth Republic
Members of Parliament for Essonne